Bolshoy Samovets is a rural locality (a selo) and the administrative center of Samovetskoye Rural Settlement, Ertilsky District, Voronezh Oblast, Russia. The population was 719 as of 2010. There are 9 streets.

Geography 
Bolshoy Samovets is located 29 km northwest of Ertil (the district's administrative centre) by road. Gnilusha is the nearest rural locality.

References 

Rural localities in Ertilsky District